Vong Pisen is a Cambodian general. He serves as Commander-in-chief of the Royal Cambodian Armed Forces .

References 

Living people
Year of birth missing (living people)
Place of birth missing (living people)
Cambodian generals